Amedeo is an Italian given name meaning "lover of God", "loves God", or more correctly "for the love of God" and cognate to the Latin name Amadeus and the Spanish and Portuguese Amadeo.

People with this name include:
 A number of rulers and nobles associated with the historical region of Savoy
 Amadeus II, Count of Savoy ( 1078–1080)
 Amadeus III, Count of Savoy (r. 1103–1148)
 Amadeus IV, Count of Savoy (r. 1233–1253)
 Amadeus V, Count of Savoy (r. 1285–1323)
 Amadeus VI, Count of Savoy (r. 1343–1383)
 Amadeus VII, Count of Savoy (r. 1383–1391)
 Amadeus VIII, Duke of Savoy (r. 1391–1440), better known as Antipope Felix V
 Amadeus IX, Duke of Savoy (r. 1465–1472)
 Amedeo di Savoia (1845–1890), later Amadeo I of Spain
 Prince Amedeo, Duke of Aosta (1898–1942)
 Prince Amedeo, Duke of Aosta (1943–2021)

Amedeo Avogadro Italian scientist
Amedeo Felisa (born 1946), CEO of Ferrari and Aston Martin
Amedeo Modigliani (a.k.a. Modi) Italian painter and sculptor
Prince Amedeo of Belgium, Archduke of Austria-Este (b. 1986)

See also

 for people with the first name Amedeo
 for people with the first name Amédéo
Amadea (disambiguation)
Amadee (disambiguation)
Amadeo (disambiguation)
Amadeus (disambiguation)
Amédée (disambiguation)

Italian masculine given names